The 1998 season of the Toppserien, the highest women's football (soccer) league in Norway, began on 25 April 1998 and ended on 17 October 1998.

18 games were played with 3 points given for wins and 1 for draws. Number nine and ten were relegated, while two teams from the First Division were promoted through a playoff round.

Asker won the league, as well as all its games.

League table

Top goalscorers
 36 goals:
  Marianne Pettersen, Asker
 16 goals:
  Ragnhild Gulbrandsen, Trondheims-Ørn
  Hege Riise, Setskog/Høland
  Silvi Jan, Kolbotn
 13 goals:
  Linda Ørmen, Athene Moss
  Anne Birgitte Nesset, Athene Moss
  Christin Lilja, Athene Moss
  Dagny Mellgren, Klepp
 12 goals:
  Elene Moseby, Setskog/Høland
 10 goals:
  Ann Kristin Aarønes, Trondheims-Ørn
 9 goals:
  Ann Elisabeth Kallevik, Setskog/Høland
  Ingrid Camilla Fosse Sæthre, Bjørnar
  Monica Knudsen, Asker

Promotion and relegation
 Fløya and Byåsen were relegated to the First Division.
 Grand Bodø and Kaupanger were promoted from the First Division through playoff.

References

League table
Fixtures
Goalscorers

Top level Norwegian women's football league seasons
1
Nor
Nor